is a small athletic and multi-purpose stadium (capacity 10,202), opened in 1990 at Honjō Park in Ohiraki, Yahata Nishi-ku, Kitakyushu, Fukuoka prefecture, Japan.

Association football
It was the designated home stadium for Giravanz Kitakyushu (formerly known as New Wave Kitakyushu until 2009 season), an association football club promoted to J. League from 2010 season to 2016 season. It underwent a major renovation which lasted until 2010 to install benches on the grass-covered spectator area to meet the minimum requirements of 10,000-seatings which J. League organization requires all J2 clubs to have their own stadia.  Now its capacity is 10,202.

Rugby

It was the venue for Japan versus Tonga in the inaugural IRB Pacific 5 Nations rugby union tournament on June 4, 2006. The game celebrated the recent opening on March 16, 2006, of the New Kitakyushu Airport and was the first test match to be played in Kyūshū in 22 years. Some 8,100 spectators saw the game in a nearly full stadium.

Together with Sayagatani stadium in Tobata ward, Honjo stadium hosted the All Japan rugby clubs championship on January 13 and 14, 2008.

On December 5, 2009, the first Top League game ever held in Kitakyushu was played here. Coca-Cola West Red Sparks beat Ricoh Black Rams 29-22.

Access

The nearest railway station is Honjō Station and Futajima Station on the Chikuhō Main Line, 15 minutes walk away. The Kitakyushu City Buses line No. 30 from Orio Station takes about ten minutes to the stadium and costs 230 yen. Kitakyushu City Buses runs shuttle buses between the stadium and Orio Station when Giravanz plays home games.

See also
Chichibunomiya Rugby Stadium
Global Arena
Kintetsu Hanazono Rugby Stadium
Olympic Stadium (Tokyo)
Level-5 stadium
Mikuni World Stadium Kitakyushu

References

External links
 Honjo Athletic Stadium - photos on the Kitakyushu Film Commission site (promoting possible venues for movies)

Football venues in Japan
Rugby union stadiums in Japan
Rugby in Kyushu
Buildings and structures in Kitakyushu
Athletics (track and field) venues in Japan
Multi-purpose stadiums in Japan
Giravanz Kitakyushu
Sports venues in Fukuoka Prefecture
1990 establishments in Japan
Sports venues completed in 1990